Sibir is a rural locality (a village) in Shalakushskoye Rural Settlement of Nyandomsky District, Arkhangelsk Oblast, Russia. The population was 7 as of 2010. There is 1 street.

Geography 
Sibir is located 64 km north of Nyandoma (the district's administrative centre) by road. Mezhdudvorye is the nearest rural locality.

References 

Rural localities in Nyandomsky District